The Dureung Du clan is one of the Korean clans. Their Bon-gwan is in Duling (Dureung in Korean) County, in modern Shaanxi, China. According to the research held in 2000, the number of Turung Tu clan’s member was 5701. Their founder was  who lived in Jingzhao and worked as the Minister of War in Song dynasty during Emperor Taizong of Song’s reign.  appealed against Emperor Zhenzong’s royal succession. Then, ’s descendant founded Turung Tu clan.

See also 
 Korean clan names of foreign origin

References

External links 
 

 
Du clans
Korean clan names of Chinese origin